The College of Health Care Professions (CHCP) is a private for-profit school of allied health professions with its headquarters in Houston, Texas, and multiple campuses throughout the state.

History  
In 1988, the physicians of MacGregor Medical Association, a physician’s practice of Texas Medical Center, founded the Academy of Health Care Professions. Its purpose was to provide quality training of allied health staff in-house, to support MacGregor’s growth. In 1990, the academy was approved by the Texas Workforce Commission to provide allied health education and training. In 2012, the Academy of Health Care Professions was renamed The College of Health Care Professions (CHCP).

Accreditation
CHCP is accredited by the Accrediting Bureau of Health Education Schools (ABHES).

References

External links
 }

Medical schools in Texas
Private universities and colleges in Texas
Education in McAllen, Texas
Educational institutions established in 1988
1988 establishments in Texas